Long Shot Party (often stylized as LONG SHOT PARTY) was a Japanese six-piece ska band, formed in Sendai, 1998. 
They released their first mini-album titled Making Ourself Understood in our Sounds in January 2000. And then, in October 2002, their first full album Delta Force released on the Indie Label.

In October 2007, they signed with a major label, DefSTAR Records, and released their first major single, "Distance", in January 2008, which was used as the second opening theme for the anime series Naruto Shippuden. Their single "Ano Hi Time Machine" was an opening theme of the anime television series Zoku Natsume Yūjinchō. The band broke up in 2010.

Discography

Singles

Albums

Japanese rock music groups
Japanese ska groups
Defstar Records artists
Musical groups from Miyagi Prefecture